Gladiator: Music From the Motion Picture is the original soundtrack of the 2000 film of the same name. The original score and songs were composed by Hans Zimmer and Lisa Gerrard and were released in 2000, titled Gladiator: Music From the Motion Picture. The Lyndhurst Orchestra performing the score was conducted by Gavin Greenaway.

The album won the Golden Globe Award for Best Original Score and was also nominated for the Academy Award and BAFTA Award for Best Score ("Anthony Asquith Award for Film Music").

Track listing

Year-end charts

Certifications

More Music From the Motion Picture

On February 27, 2001, nearly a year after the first soundtrack's release, Decca released Gladiator: More Music From the Motion Picture. This CD contained additional 18 cuts from the film (including unused tracks and remixes of earlier scores, such as "Now We Are Free"). Many tracks also use dialogue from the movie, such as Maximus Decimus Meridius' quote "Father to a murdered son, husband to a murdered wife... and I will have my vengeance."

Track listing

Special Anniversary Edition

For the film's 5-year anniversary, a double CD edition was released combining the two previous editions.

Musical impact

Hans Zimmer's style influenced many composers, who used elements like female wailing vocals and the "battle waltz" for ancient war movies that followed.

Harry Gregson-Williams, a member of Zimmer's own Media Ventures Productions, relayed scoring duties for Ridley Scott's later film, Kingdom of Heaven.

In April 2006, a law firm representing the Holst Foundation filed a lawsuit claiming that Zimmer had infringed the copyright of Gustav Holst's The Planets. "The Battle" from the score was claimed to infringe the copyright on "Mars, the bringer of war". The Track "Barbarian Horde" reprises most of these themes.

Film music critics noted that the score also borrows from works by Richard Wagner, particularly themes from Siegfried and Götterdämmerung, included in the latter half of "The Might of Rome" and "Am I Not Merciful?"

In 2003 Luciano Pavarotti released the song "Il gladiatore" from his album Ti Adoro. The song was based on a theme from the score, featured on the soundtrack as track 4, "Earth". Pavarotti told Billboard magazine that he was meant to sing this song in the film, "But I said no then. Too bad. It's a magnificent song and a tough movie. Still, there is so much drama in just the song."

The "Il gladiatore" version of this song was performed by Andrea Bocelli during the 2009 UEFA Champions League Final in Rome, where FC Barcelona defeated Manchester United F.C. and also during the 2016 UEFA Champions League Final in Milan, where Real Madrid C.F. was proclaimed Champion of Europe when defeating the Club Atlético de Madrid.

References

External links
 Last.FM Gladiator Soundtrack page (all tracks with previews)
 About the Lyrics of: Now we are free

Hans Zimmer soundtracks
2000s film soundtrack albums
2000 soundtrack albums
2001 soundtrack albums
Soundtrack
Lisa Gerrard albums